The Thriasio Plain is a plain in western Attica, immediately to the west of Athens, in Greece.  It is bounded by Mount Egaleo to the east, Mount Parnitha to the north, Mount Pateras to the west, and the Bay of Elefsina to the south.

History
The Thriasio Plain owes its name to the ancient deme of Thria, one the demes of ancient Athens.  The largest town in the plain was Eleusis (modern-day Elefsina), location of the famous Eleusinian Mysteries. In Greek mythology, when the goddess Athena won the contest for control of Attica over Poseidon, Poseidon flooded the plain in wrath, until called to order by Zeus.

In antiquity, as today, the area was connected to central Athens by two passes: the Sacred Way to the west, today used by the main Athens–Corinth highway, and another pass to the northwest nowadays used by the Attiki Odos highway. During the Peloponnesian War (431–404 BC) the Thriasio Plain was ravaged by the Spartan army of King Archidamus II in his campaign against the Athenians.

Modern times
Today it is largely an industrial area, hosting some of Greece's major industrial facilities, such as its largest oil refineries and steel mills.  There are four cities in the Thriasio Plain:  Elefsina (anc. Eleusis), Mandra, Magoula, and Aspropyrgos.  The plain hosts a major air force base outside of Elefsina, as well as a major station of the Athens Suburban Rail.  As of 2010, there are plans to create a major center for the transshipment of commercial goods unloaded in the nearby port of Pireas (Athens port) to the rest of Greece and neighboring countries. The Thriasio Plain is particularly vulnerable to high temperatures due to its topography and has experienced the highest temperatures ever recorded in Greece and Europe with 48.0 °C in Elefsina and 47.5°C in Aspropyrgos in 1977 and 2007 respectively.

References

Landforms of Attica
Geography of Athens
Plains of Greece
Landforms of West Attica
Locations in Greek mythology
Geography of ancient Attica